Erth may refer to:

Earth, planet
 Erth, visual theatre company resident at the Carriageworks art complex in Sydney, Australia
Saint Erc, early Irish saint in Cornwall
Urith, southwestern Brythonic martyr